Joy Petersen Packer (12 February 1905 – 7 September 1977) was a South African author of autobiography and romantic adventure novels.

Biography

Packer was born and educated in Cape Town, graduating as a journalist from the University of Cape Town. She worked initially as a free-lance journalist, in 1931 becoming a reporter for London's Daily Express. After this, she spent time on radio in Hong Kong as well as a stint writing for British publications in the Balkans. World War II saw her as a broadcaster to South Africa for the BBC, then later working in the Ministry of Information in Egypt, as at Allied Headquarters in Italy. Her travelling was tied up with her marriage to a British admiral, Sir Herbert Packer.  When her husband was knighted in the 1950 Honours list, Mrs. Joy Packer automatically became known as "Lady Packer", a courtesy title.

Works
Her first works of note were three volumes of memoirs published from 1945 to 1953 dealing with her travels throughout the world during the period before, during, and just after World War II with her husband. Places visited included Britain, the Mediterranean, the Balkans, and China. In the early 1950s, she went on a substantial tour of Africa, which is included in her later published final three volumes of memoirs.

In the 1950s, she also began publishing novels, starting with Valley of the Vines in 1955, which sold more than 600,000 copies in English, and was translated into at least nine European languages. Although her novels' principal themes were romantic, several sources state them as also important for their sociopolitical commentary of South Africa at the time. Her second novel, Nor the Moon by Night was made into a British film of the same name. In America, it was released as Elephant Gun.

Novels
 Valley of the Vines (1955)
 The High Roof (1959)
 Nor the Moon by Night'''(1957)
 The Glass Barrier (1961)
 The Man in the Mews (1964)
 The Blind Spot (1967)
 Leopard in the Fold (1969)
 Veronica (1970)
 Boomerang (1972)
 Dark Curtain (1977)

Memoirs
 Pack and Follow (1945)
 Grey Mistress (1949) on HMS Warspite
 Apes and Ivory (1953)
 Home from the Sea (1963)
 The World is a Proud Place (1966)
 Deep as the Sea (1975) A biography of Admiral Sir Bertie Packer

References

Sources
 Book jackets from original editions of Nor the Moon by Night and Valley of the Vines''

External links
 Summary of a biography published on Joy Packer
 page for film Nor the Moon by Night 
 Record on Library of Congress database
 www.getawaytoafrica.com 
 (Source of Birth date)
 Authors

1905 births
1977 deaths
University of Cape Town alumni
South African women novelists
20th-century South African women writers
20th-century South African novelists
South African memoirists
Women memoirists
20th-century memoirists